Pyrus may refer to:
 The genus of the pear tree (under some taxonomy, sometimes including species of genera Malus and Sorbus)
 Main//Pyrus DMS, a Document Management System
 The PEAR (PHP Extension and Application Repository) installer, requiring at least PHP 5.3, to replace the previous PEAR installer
 Pyrus (software), a cloud-based workflow automation system
 Pyrus Series, a Nordic Christmas calendar in Denmark